This article contains a list of notable cases decided by the High Court of Australia.

Citation numbers for the decisions are as tracked by LawCite, a citation tracker managed by the Free Access to Law Movement.

References

See also 
List of Privy Council cases
List of Court of Disputed Returns cases
List of Federal Court of Australia cases
List of Australian Supreme Court cases

High Court

High Court of Australia
Australian case law